Rafael Nadal defeated Novak Djokovic in the final, 6–4, 5–7, 6–4, 6–2 to win the men's singles tennis title at the 2010 US Open. It was his ninth major title, and he completed the career Golden Slam with the win. Nadal became the first man since Rod Laver in 1969 to win the French Open, Wimbledon, and the US Open in the same calendar year, as well as the first man in history to win the Surface Slam (majors on clay, grass, and hard courts in the same calendar year). He lost only one set during the tournament, to Djokovic in the final.

Juan Martín del Potro was the reigning champion, but did not participate this year, after undergoing a wrist operation in May and only starting to practice again in August. Del Potro thus became the third man in the Open Era not to attempt to defend the US Open title, after Ken Rosewall in 1971 and Pete Sampras in 2003.

For the first time in history, no American man was seeded in the top eight at the US Open.

Seeds

Qualifying draw

Main draw

Finals

Top half

Section 1

Section 2

Section 3

Section 4

Bottom half

Section 5

Section 6

Section 7

Section 8

References

External links
 Association of Tennis Professionals (ATP) – 2010 US Open Men's Singles draw
2010 US Open – Men's draws and results at the International Tennis Federation

Men's Singles
US Open (tennis) by year – Men's singles